The 2021–22 season is the 125th season of competitive football in Scotland. The domestic season began on the weekend of 10 July 2021 with the first Scottish League Cup group stage matches. Most regional leagues began on the weekend of 17 July and the opening round of matches in the 2021–22 Scottish Professional Football League were played on 31 July.

Transfer deals

League competitions

Scottish Premiership

Scottish Championship

Scottish League One

Scottish League Two

Non-league football

Level 5

Level 6

Highland

Lowland

Honours

Cup honours

Non-league honours

Individual honours

PFA Scotland awards

SFWA awards

Scottish clubs in Europe

Summary

Rangers
UEFA Champions League

Rangers entered the 2021–22 UEFA Champions League in the third qualifying round.

UEFA Europa League

Celtic
UEFA Champions League

Due to Scotland rising into the top fifteen places of the UEFA coefficient table, the league was given two places in the 2021–22 UEFA Champions League. Celtic entered the competition in the second qualifying round.

UEFA Europa League

UEFA Europa Conference League

St Johnstone
UEFA Europa League

As winners of the 2020–21 Scottish Cup, St Johnstone entered the 2021–22 UEFA Europa League in the third qualifying round.

UEFA Europa Conference League

Hibernian
UEFA Europa Conference League

Hibernian qualified for the 2021–22 UEFA Europa Conference League and entered in the second qualifying round.

Aberdeen
UEFA Europa Conference League

Aberdeen qualified for the 2021–22 UEFA Europa Conference League and entered in the second qualifying round.

Scotland national team

Women's football

SWPL 1

SWPL 2

League honours

Cup honours

Individual honours

UEFA Women's Champions League
Glasgow City and Celtic qualified for the Women's Champions League.

Glasgow City

Celtic

Scotland women's national team

Deaths
 10 July: Jimmy Gabriel, 80, Dundee and Scotland defender.
 11 July: Charlie Gallagher, 80, Celtic and Dumbarton forward.
 14 July: Ken Ronaldson, 75, Aberdeen forward.
 c. 14 July: John Anderson, 84, Greenock Morton and Third Lanark winger.
 20 July: Billy Reid, 83, Motherwell and Airdrieonians wing half. 
 21 July: Tommy Leishman, 83, Hibernian, Stranraer and St Mirren wing half.
 26 July: Ally Dawson, 63, Rangers, Airdrieonians and Scotland defender; Hamilton Academical manager.
 30 July: John May, 79, Forfar Athletic forward.
 13 August: Bobby Stein, 82, Raith Rovers, Montrose and East Stirlingshire right back.
 25 August: Alan Ewing, 52, Stranraer midfielder.
 25 August: Bobby Waddell, 81, Dundee, East Fife and Montrose forward.
 25 September: Ian Riddell, St Mirren and Berwick Rangers left-back.
 c.26 September: Bert Ferguson, 67, Ayr United, St Mirren and Stranraer winger.
 9 October: Billy Lamont, 85, Hamilton Academical goalkeeper and East Stirlingshire, Falkirk and Dumbarton manager.
 17 October: George Kinnell, 83, Aberdeen midfielder.
 October: Frank MacGregor, 83, Clyde full back.
26 October: Walter Smith, 73, Dundee United and Dumbarton defender; Rangers and Scotland manager.
 October: Walter Cameron, Arbroath full back.
4 November: Paul Kelly, 57, Alloa Athletic, Stenhousemuir, Stranraer and East Stirlingshire midfielder.
6 November: Jim Kerray, 85, Raith Rovers, Dunfermline Athletic, St. Johnstone, Stirling Albion and Falkirk forward.
14 November: Bertie Auld, 83, Celtic, Dumbarton, Hibernian and Scotland midfielder; Partick Thistle, Hibernian, Hamilton Academical and Dumbarton manager.
24 November: Frank Burrows, 77, Raith Rovers central defender.
26 November: Doug Cowie, 95, Dundee and Scotland centre-half and wing-half.
14 December: Kenny Hope, 80, referee.
15 December: Willie McSeveney, 92, Dunfermline Athletic and Motherwell defender.
December: George Ryden, 81, Dundee, St Johnstone and Stirling Albion centre-half.
25 January: Wim Jansen, 75, Celtic manager.
January: Bob Stirrat, East Fife defender.
3 February: Alex Ingram, 77, Queen's Park and Ayr United forward.
4 February: Davie Cattanach, 75, Stirling Albion, Celtic and Falkirk wing half.
19 February: Doug Baillie, 85, Airdrie, Rangers, Third Lanark, Falkirk and  Dunfermline Athletic centre-half.
27 February: Alan Anderson, 82, Falkirk, Alloa Athletic, Hearts and Scotland centre-half.
3 March: Frank Connor, 86, Celtic, St Mirren, Albion Rovers and Cowdenbeath goalkeeper; Cowdenbeath, Berwick Rangers and Raith Rovers manager.
13 March: Paul Hampshire, 40, Raith Rovers, Berwick Rangers and East Fife midfielder.
March: Tom NcNiven, 87, Hibs caretaker manager and trainer.
March: Andy Geddes, 62, Dundee forward.
18 April: Graham Fyfe, 70, Rangers, Hibernian and Dumbarton winger.
10 June: Bobby Hope, 78, Scotland midfielder.
14 June: Davie Wilson, 85, Rangers, Dundee United, Dumbarton and Scotland winger; Dumbarton and Queen of the South manager.
25 June: Finn Døssing, 81, Dundee United forward.
25 June: Alan Salisbury, 65, St. Johnstone forward.

Notes and references

 
Seasons in Scottish football
S
S